In enzymology, a (S)-3-amino-2-methylpropionate transaminase is an enzyme that catalyzes the chemical reaction

(S)-3-amino-2-methylpropanoate + 2-oxoglutarate  2-methyl-3-oxopropanoate + L-glutamate

Thus, the two substrates of this enzyme are (S)-3-amino-2-methylpropanoate and 2-oxoglutarate, whereas its two products are 2-methyl-3-oxopropanoate and L-glutamate.

This enzyme belongs to the family of transferases, specifically the transaminases, which transfer nitrogenous groups.  The systematic name of this enzyme class is (S)-3-amino-2-methylpropanoate:2-oxoglutarate aminotransferase. Other names in common use include L-3-aminoisobutyrate transaminase, beta-aminobutyric transaminase, L-3-aminoisobutyric aminotransferase, and beta-aminoisobutyrate-alpha-ketoglutarate transaminase.  This enzyme participates in valine, leucine and isoleucine degradation.

References

 
 

EC 2.6.1
Enzymes of unknown structure